Eustratius Garidas (? – after 1084) was Ecumenical Patriarch of Constantinople between 1081 and 1084.  A monk, he was elevated to the patriarchal throne through the influence of the mother of the emperor Alexios I, Anna Dalassene, to whom he had become an intimate advisor.  He was an eunuch.

Anna Comnena and other writers describe him as uneducated and of weak character. Due to his illiteracy and apparent gullibility he was involved in the case of John Italus, whom his predecessor, Patriarch Cosmas I of Constantinople  had condemned. Alexios had to take over the case against Italus as Eustratius, in his words,"rather dwelt at leisure and preferred peace and quiest to noisy throngs, and turned to God alone."

During the war against the Normans, at the beginning of the reign of Alexios in 1081–1082, Garidas did not resist the expropriation of artworks and consecrated treasures of the capital's churches, destined to be melted for currency to pay the army of Alexios I. This lack of resistance was not forgiven by Leo of Chalcedon who sought to expel him from his throne, at one point also accusing him, without evidence, of diverting part of the appropriate treasure for his own use. Finally, accused of heresy, Eustratios was cleared by a commission of inquiry established by Alexios in 1084, but he chose to abdicate.

References

Sources
Ecumenical Patriarchate
Buckler, Georgina. Anna Komnena: A Study. Oxford: University Press, 1929.
Comnena, Anna. The Alexiad. New York: Penguin, 2003.
Hussey, J.M.. The Orthodox Church in the Byzantine Empire. Oxford: University Press, 1986.

11th-century patriarchs of Constantinople
Byzantine eunuchs